Paul Jacquot (born 26 December 1995) is a Swiss rower. He competed in the 2020 Summer Olympics.

References

1995 births
Living people
Rowers at the 2020 Summer Olympics
Swiss male rowers
Olympic rowers of Switzerland